The British Journal of Haematology is a peer-reviewed medical journal focusing on hematology and other blood-related topics, such as blood diseases and their treatment.  It is published by [Wiley] on behalf of the British Society for Haematology.

Indexing 
According to the Journal Citation Reports, the British Journal of Haematology had a 2016 impact factor of 5.67, ranking it 10th out of 70 in the category "Hematology". In addition, the journal is indexed in:

External links 
 British Journal of Haematology website

References

Wiley-Blackwell academic journals
Publications established in 1955
English-language journals
Hematology journals
Academic journals associated with learned and professional societies of the United Kingdom
1955 establishments in the United Kingdom